Killer at Large is a 1936 American mystery film directed by David Selman from a script by Harold Shumate, which stars Mary Brian, Russell Hardie, and George McKay.

Plot

Cast list
 Mary Brian as Linda Allen
 Russell Hardie as Tommy Braddock
 George McKay as Sergeant Kelly
 Thurston Hall as Inspector O'Hara
 Henry Brandon as Mr. Zero
 Betty Compson as Kate
 Harry Hayden as William Bentley
 Boyd Irwin as Whitley
 Charles R. Moore as Highpockets
 Harry Bernard as Sexton
 Edward LeSaint as Landlord
 Alma Chester as Old lady
 Rolf Ernest as Messenger
 Lee Shumway as Police captain
 William Arnold as Police operator
 Beatrice Curtis as Shop girl
 Brady Kline as Lieutenant
 James Millican as Hotel clerk
 Charles Dorety as Stunt driver
 Roger Gray as Coffin man
 Lon Chaney Jr. as Coffin man

(Cast list as per AFI database)

References

External links
 
 
 

Columbia Pictures films
Films directed by David Selman
1936 mystery films
1936 films
American mystery films
American black-and-white films
1930s English-language films
1930s American films